Clerk-Maxwell, a double-barrelled name, may refer to:
George Clerk-Maxwell, 4th Baronet of Penicuik
James Clerk Maxwell (1831–1879), physicist and mathematician

See also
 List of things named after James Clerk Maxwell

Compound surnames